George Ernest Salazar (born March 7, 1986) is an American actor, singer, and musician known for his work on and off-Broadway. He made his Broadway debut in the 2011 revival of Stephen Schwartz's  Godspell. Salazar originated the role of as Michael Mell in the 2015 musical Be More Chill and performed in the musical's 2018 Off-Broadway and Broadway in 2019 at the Lyceum Theater in New York City, New York. He originated the role of Grover in The Lightning Thief: The Percy Jackson Musical and starred in Pasadena Playhouse's production of Little Shop of Horrors as Seymour Krelborn.

Early life and education
Salazar is originally from Kissimmee, Florida. He was raised in Orlando, Florida. His mother, Jonah, is Filipino and his father, George, is Ecuadorian. Growing up, Salazar focused his studies on pursuing a career as a doctor but switched his focus to the theater in his last two years of high school. After graduating high school, he attended the University of Florida where he majored in Musical Theatre. In 2008, he graduated from the University of Florida with a BFA degree in Musical Theatre. He moved to New York City shortly after to pursue his acting career. He is also an experienced percussionist on drumkit and cajón.

Acting career

Salazar's first break came in 2010 when he was cast as "Otto" in the second national tour of the Tony Award-winning musical Spring Awakening. The production toured the United States as well as Canada and closed in May 2011. Upon returning to New York City from touring, Salazar earned his Actors' Equity Association membership.

In September 2011, Salazar was cast in the 40th Anniversary Broadway revival of Stephen Schwartz's Godspell. In the revival, he was the "Light of the World" soloist, marking his Broadway debut. The show opened at Broadway's Circle in the Square Theatre on November 7, 2011, and closed on June 24, 2012, after 30 previews and 264 performances. A cast album was recorded and released on Sh-K-Boom Records in 2012. During Godspells run, he and the rest of the cast made television appearances on the Late Show with David Letterman, The View, The Rosie Show, and the Tony Awards telecast.

In the Spring of 2013, Salazar further combined his passions for theatre and music as a cast member and musician in the Off-Broadway production of F#%king Up Everything. In addition to playing the stoner drummer of a rock band, he served as the musical's on-stage drummer. This role was later reprised in 2016 when the musical changed its name to Brooklyn Crush.

In the summer of 2013, Salazar became an understudy in The Public Theater's Off-Broadway production of David Byrne and Fatboy Slim's Here Lies Love, directed by Alex Timbers. In April 2014, Salazar rejoined the cast of Here Lies Love in an open-ended commercial run at the musical's original home, The Public Theater, as an onstage member of the ensemble. The production closed on January 4, 2015.

In 2015, Salazar joined the cast of the musical adaptation of Ned Vizzini's Be More Chill as Michael Mell at the Two River Theater in Red Bank, New Jersey. The production closed on June 28, 2015.

In 2016, Salazar played Michael in the Off-Broadway revival of Tick, Tick... Boom!, which opened on October 20, 2016, at the Acorn Theatre at Theater Row. The production ran from October 20 to December 18.

In 2017, Salazar played the characters of Grover and Mr. D in the Off-Broadway premiere of The Lightning Thief. The limited production ran from March 23 to May 6.

In 2018, Salazar reprised his role as Michael Mell in Be More Chill in the Off-Broadway premiere of the musical at Signature Theatre Company from July to September 2018.

In 2019, Salazar played Michael Mell in Be More Chill at the Lyceum Theatre from February 14, 2019, to August 11, 2019, on Broadway.

In 2019, Salazar starred in Little Shop of Horrors at Pasadena Playhouse as Seymour Krelborn from September 17, 2019, to October 20, 2019. During that time he was featured as a musical guest on The Late Late Show with James Corden on CBS where he sang "Suddenly Seymour" with Little Shop of Horrors co-star Mj Rodriguez.

In 2021, Salazar played Musidorus in Head Over Heels at Pasadena Playhouse from November 9, 2019, to December 12, 2019. It is his first theatre acting role since the start of the COVID-19 pandemic, and the first show to reopen Pasadena Playhouse.

He can currently be heard as Agent Maxwell Fernsby in As the Curtain Rises, an original Broadway soap opera from the Broadway Podcast Network.

Theatre credits

Filmography

Television

Awards and nominations

Discography

References

External links 
 
 
 
 
 

1986 births
21st-century American male actors
Male actors from New York (state)
American male actors of Filipino descent
American people of Ecuadorian descent
American male musical theatre actors
American gay actors
American LGBT people of Asian descent
LGBT Hispanic and Latino American people
University of Florida alumni
Living people